Witzleben is a municipality in the district Ilm-Kreis in Thuringia, Germany.

References

Ilm-Kreis
Schwarzburg-Sondershausen